Airtel Super Singer 2, the second season of the music competition reality show Airtel Super Singer, premiered on 7 July 2008. Judges for the show were Sujatha, P. Unnikrishnan and Srinivas. Chinmayi was the host of the show until January 2009 and was followed by Malini Yugendran (Hayma Malini) and Yugendran Vasudevan Nair. The voice trainer was Ananth Vaidyanathan.

Ajeesh won the competition. Ravi and Renu took the second and third positions respectively. Ajeesh was chosen by Yuvan Shankar Raja to sing the song Idhu Varai for the Tamil movie, Goa. The audio for the movie for released in December 2009.

Grand Finale 3 June 2009
  Ravi 
 "Kanmuney" (film: Thulluvadho Ilamai, singer: Yuvan Shankar Raja)
 "Kallai Mattum" (film: Dasavathaaram, singer: Hariharan)

  Renu 
 "Hai rama oru vaarama" (Swarnalatha)(film: Rangeela)
 "Nenjodu Kalanthidu" (Sujatha)(film: 7G Rainbow Colony)

  Ajeesh
 "Sangeetha Jaathi Mullai" (singer:S.P.B)(film: Kathal Oviyam)
 "Ninaithu Ninaithu" (singer: KK)(film: 7G Rainbow Colony)

Finalists
 Ravi
"Oru naal podhuma" (M. Balamuralikrishna, K. V. Mahadevan)
"Ooh Mama" (Shankar Mahadevan, Tippu, Harris Jayaraj from Minnale)
"In the End" (Linkin Park)
"Unakkenna Mele Nindrai" (from Simla Special)
 Ranjani
"Porale ponnuthaayi" Swarnalatha
"Kannodu Kaanbathellam" (Nithyashree, A. R. Rahman from Jeans)
"Paalvadiyum Mugam" (Maharajapuram Santhanam, Oothukkadu Venkata Subbaier)
"Jill Endru Oru Kaadhal" (Tanvi, A. R. Rahman from Sillunu Oru Kaadhal)
"The Winner Takes It All" (ABBA)
 Ajesh
"Adal Kalaye" (K. J. Yesudas, Illayaraja from Sri Raghavendra)
"Muralidara Gopala" (M. L. Vasanthakumari)
"Girlfriend" (Karthik, Tippu and Timmy, A. R. Rahman from Boys)
"One Love" (Blue)
"Kaatukuyile" (from Thalapathi)
 Renu
"Kanda Naal Mudhalai" (Subhiksha and Pooja, Yuvan Shankar Raja from Kanda Naal Mudhal)
"Mudhal Naal" (K. K. Mahalakshmi and Shalini, Harris Jayaraj from Unnale Unnale)
"Unfaithful" (Rihanna)
 Prasanna
"Sangeetha Jaathimullai Kaanavillai" (S. P. Balasubrahmanyam, Illayaraja from Kadhal Oviyam)
"Venkatachala Nilayam" (Purandara Dasa)
"Something Something" (Tippu, Devi Sri Prasad from Something Something... Unnakum Ennakum)
"Bailamos" (Enrique Iglesias)

Semi finals
 Ajeesh
 "Thoongatha Vizhigal" (K. J. Yesudas, from Agni Nakshatram)
 "Elangaathu Veesudhey" (Sriram Parthasarathy, from Pithamagan)
 Ravi
"Rasathi Unna" (Jayachandran, from Vaidehi Kaathirundaal)
"Kalaivaniye" (K. J. Yesudas, from Sindhu Bhairavi)
 Renu
 "Edhedho Ennam Valarthen" (K. S. Chithra, from Punnagai Mannan)
 "Anandha raagam" (Uma Ramanan)
 "Unna Vida" (Shreya Ghoshal, from Virumaandi)
 Vijay Narayan
"Isayil Thodanguthamma" (Ajay Chakraborthy, Illayaraja from Hey Ram)
"Sadho Sadho" (Hindustani)
"Uyirin Uyirae" (Kay Kay, Suchitra, Harris Jayaraj from Kaakha Kaakha)
"Hotel California" (Eagles)
 Raginisri
"Ellam Enbamayam" (M. L. Vasanthakumari and P. Leela from Manamagal)
"Unakkena Naan" (Ramya NSK, Vijay Antony from Kadhalil Vizhundhen)
"I attempt from love's sickness to fly" (Henry Purcell)
"Vegam Vegam" (Usha Uthup from Anjali)

Elimination chart

References

External links
 

Star Vijay original programming
2008 Tamil-language television series debuts
2008 Tamil-language television seasons
Tamil-language singing talent shows
Tamil-language reality television series
Tamil-language television shows
2009 Tamil-language television series endings
Television shows set in Tamil Nadu
Airtel Super Singer seasons